Caenotropus is a genus of chilodontid headstanders from South America, found in the Orinoco, Parnaíba, and Amazon Basins, as well as various rivers in the Guianas.  The currently described species in this genus are:
 Caenotropus labyrinthicus (Kner, 1858)
 Caenotropus maculosus (C. H. Eigenmann, 1912)
 Caenotropus mestomorgmatos Vari, R. M. C. Castro & Raredon, 1995
 Caenotropus schizodon Scharcansky & C. A. S. de Lucena, 2007

References
 

Chilodontidae (fish)
Fish of South America
Taxa named by Albert Günther